Finger-counting, also known as dactylonomy, is the act of counting using one's fingers. There are multiple different systems used across time and between cultures, though many of these have seen a decline in use because of the spread of Arabic numerals.

Finger-counting can serve as a form of manual communication, particularly in marketplace trading – including hand signaling during open outcry in floor trading – and also in games such as morra.

Finger-counting is known to go back to ancient Egypt at least, and probably even further back.

Historical counting 

Complex systems of dactylonomy were used in the ancient world. The Greco-Roman author Plutarch, in his Lives, mentions finger counting as being used in Persia in the first centuries CE, so the practice may have originated in Iran. It was later used widely in medieval Islamic lands. The earliest reference to this method of using the hands to refer to the natural numbers may have been in some Prophetic traditions going back to the early days of Islam during the early 600s. In one tradition as reported by Yusayra, Muhammad enjoined upon his female companions to express praise to God and to count using their fingers (=واعقدن بالأنامل )( سنن الترمذي).

In Arabic, dactylonomy is known as "Number reckoning by finger folding" (=حساب العقود ). The practice was well known in the Arabic-speaking world and was quite commonly used as evidenced by the numerous references to it in Classical Arabic literature. Poets could allude to a miser by saying that his hand made "ninety-three", i.e. a closed fist, the sign of avarice. When an old man was asked how old he was he could answer by showing a closed fist, meaning 93. The gesture for 50 was used by some poets (for example Ibn Al-Moutaz) to describe the beak of the goshawk.

Some of the gestures used to refer to numbers were even known in Arabic by special technical terms such as Kas' (=القصع ) for the gesture signifying 29, Dabth (=الـضَـبْـث ) for 63 and Daff (= الـضَـفّ) for 99 (فقه اللغة). 
The polymath Al-Jahiz advised schoolmasters in his book Al-Bayan (البيان والتبيين) to teach finger counting which he placed among the five methods of human expression. Similarly, Al-Suli, in his Handbook for Secretaries, wrote that scribes preferred dactylonomy to any other system because it required neither materials nor an instrument, apart from a limb. Furthermore, it ensured secrecy and was thus in keeping with the dignity of the scribe's profession.

Books dealing with dactylonomy, such as a treatise by the mathematician Abu'l-Wafa al-Buzajani, gave rules for performing complex operations, including the approximate determination of square roots. Several pedagogical poems dealt exclusively with finger counting, some of which were translated into European languages, including a short poem by Shamsuddeen Al-Mawsili (translated into French by Aristide Marre) and one by Abul-Hasan Al-Maghribi (translated into German by Julius Ruska).

A very similar form is presented by the English monk and historian Bede in the first chapter of his De temporum ratione, (725), entitled "Tractatus de computo, vel loquela per gestum digitorum", which allowed counting up to 9,999 on two hands, though it was apparently little-used for numbers of 100 or more. This system remained in use through the European Middle Ages, being presented in slightly modified form by Luca Pacioli in his seminal Summa de arithmetica (1494).

By country or region
Finger-counting varies between cultures and over time, and is studied by ethnomathematics. Cultural differences in counting are sometimes used as a shibboleth, particularly to distinguish nationalities in war time. These form a plot point in the film Inglourious Basterds, by Quentin Tarantino, and in the book Pi in the Sky, by John D. Barrow.

Asia
Finger-counting systems in use in many regions of Asia allow for counting to 12 by using a single hand. The thumb acts as a pointer touching the three finger bones of each finger in turn, starting with the outermost bone of the little finger. One hand is used to count numbers up to 12. The other hand is used to display the number of completed base-12s. This continues until twelve dozen is reached, therefore 144 is counted.

Chinese number gestures count up to 10 but can exhibit some regional differences.

In Japan, counting for oneself begins with the palm of one hand open. Like in East Slavic countries, the thumb represents number 1; the little finger is number 5. Digits are folded inwards while counting, starting with the thumb. A closed palm indicates number 5. By reversing the action, number 6 is indicated by extending the little finger. A return to an open palm signals the number 10. However to indicate numerals to others, the hand is used in the same manner as an English speaker. The index finger becomes number 1; the thumb now represents number 5. For numbers above five, the appropriate number of fingers from the other hand are placed against the palm. For example, number 7 is represented by the index and middle finger pressed against the palm of the open hand. Number 10 is displayed by presenting both hands open with outward palms.

In Korea, Chisanbop allows for signing any number between 0 and 99.

Western world

In the Western world a finger is raised for each unit. While there are extensive differences between and even within countries, there are, generally speaking, two systems. The main difference between the two systems is that the "German" or "French" system starts counting with the thumb, while the "American" system starts counting with the index finger.

In the system used for example in Germany and France, the thumb represents 1, the thumb plus the index finger represents 2, and so on, until the thumb plus the index, middle, ring, and little fingers represents 5. This continues on to the other hand, where the entire one hand plus the thumb of the other hand means 6, and so on.

In the system used in the Americas, the index finger represents 1; the index and middle fingers represents 2; the index, middle and ring fingers represents 3; the index, middle, ring, and little fingers represents 4; and the four fingers plus the thumb represents 5. This continues on to the other hand, where the entire one hand plus the index finger of the other hand means 6, and so on.

By base

Binary
See also : Finger binary

Senary
See also : Senary#Finger counting

In senary finger counting, one hand represents ones' place and the other hand represents six's place; it counts up to 55senary (35decimal). Two related representations can be expressed: wholes and sixths (counts up to 5.5 by sixths), sixths and thirty-sixths (counts up to 0.55 by thirty-sixths).

For example, "12" (left 1 right 2) can represent eight (12 senary), four-thirds (1.2 senary) or two-ninths (0.12 senary).

Other body-based counting systems
Undoubtedly the decimal (base-10) counting system came to prominence due to the widespread use of finger counting, but many other counting systems have been used throughout the world. Likewise, base-20 counting systems, such as used by the Pre-Columbian Mayan, are likely due to counting on fingers and toes. This is suggested in the languages of Central Brazilian tribes, where the word for twenty often incorporates the word for "feet". Other languages using a base-20 system often refer to twenty in terms of "men", that is, 1 "man" = 20 "fingers and toes". For instance, the Dene-Dinje tribe of North America refer to 5 as "my hand dies", 10 as "my hands have died", 15 as "my hands are dead and one foot is dead", and 20 as "a man dies".

Even the French language today shows remnants of a Gaulish base-20 system in the names of the numbers from 60 through 99.

The Yuki language in California and the Pamean languages in Mexico have octal (base-8) systems because the speakers count using the spaces between their fingers rather than the fingers themselves.

In languages of New Guinea and Australia, such as the Telefol language of Papua New Guinea, body counting is used, to give higher base counting systems, up to base-27. In Muralug Island, the counting system works as follows: Starting with the little finger of the left hand, count each finger, then for six through ten, successively touch and name the left wrist, left elbow, left shoulder, left breast and sternum. Then for eleven through to nineteen count the body parts in reverse order on the right side of the body (with the right little finger signifying nineteen). A variant among the Papuans of New Guinea uses on the left, the fingers, then the wrist, elbow, shoulder, left ear and left eye. Then on the right, the eye, nose, mouth, right ear, shoulder, wrist and finally, the fingers of the right hand, adding up to 22 anusi which means little finger.

See also 

 Finger binary
 Chisanbop
 Tally marks
 Prehistoric numerals
 Chinese number gestures

Notes

References

 ; 2nd edition, Brown University Press, 1957; reprint, New York: Dover publications, 1969; reprint, New York: Barnes and Noble Books, 1993.

External links
 Counting in American Sign Language
 Counting with your fingers in France
 Finger Counting Questionnaire
  Yutaka Nishiyama, Counting With The Fingers.

 
Articles containing video clips